Murray Fahey is an Australian actor, writer and director.

Select Credits

as Actor
Slate, Wyn & Me (1987) as Martin

as Director
Get Away, Get Away (1992)
Encounters (1993)
Sex Is a Four Letter Word (1995)
Dags (1998)
Cubbyhouse (2001)
LoveStuck (2017)

Producer Only
Alex and Eve (2016)

References

External links

Australian directors
Australian male film actors
Australian male soap opera actors
Australian writers
Living people
20th-century Australian male actors
21st-century Australian male actors
Year of birth missing (living people)